In mathematical logic, abstract model theory is a generalization of model theory that studies the general properties of extensions of first-order logic and their models.

Abstract model theory provides an approach that allows us to step back and study a wide range of logics and their relationships. The starting point for the study of abstract models, which resulted in good examples was Lindström's theorem.

In 1974 Jon Barwise provided an axiomatization of abstract model theory.

See also
 Lindström's theorem
 Institution (computer science)
 Institutional model theory

References

Further reading
 

Mathematical logic
Metatheorems
Model theory